"Hank Williams, You Wrote My Life " is a song written by Paul Craft, and recorded by American country music artist Moe Bandy.  It was released in late 1975 as the title track from his fourth album, and was his first single after signing with Columbia Records.

Background
Bandy had become a critically acclaimed artist, recording and performing in the honky-tonk style, during the previous two years while under contract with GRC Records. Songs such as ""I Just Started Hatin' Cheatin' Songs Today," "Honky-Tonk Amnesia," "It Was Always So Easy (To Find an Unhappy Woman)" and "Bandy the Rodeo Clown" became big country hits in 1974-1975, and his star power and reputation was increasing. By the fall of 1975, Bandy had signed a contract with Columbia Records, and one of the first songs he recorded was "Hank Williams, You Wrote My Life."

Content
Bandy's earlier songs and method of putting across themes of heartbreak, lost love and use of alcohol as solace showed his being influenced by Hank Williams, and that was furthered by "Hank Williams, You Wrote My Life." The song makes use of a number of Williams-penned-and-recorded song titles in the lyrics ("You wrote 'Your Cheatin' Heart' about a gal like my first ex-wife/You moan the blues for me and for you/Hank Williams, you wrote my life") to express deep sorrow and sadness following a bitter breakup of a relationship. In addition to "Your Cheatin' Heart" and "Moanin' the Blues," song titles listed or referenced in the lyrics included "Cold, Cold Heart," "Half as Much," "I'm So Lonesome I Could Cry," "(I Heard That) Lonesome Whistle," and "The Blues Come Around."

Chart performance
"Hank Williams ... " would become Bandy's biggest hit yet, peaking at No. 2 on the Billboard Hot Country Songs chart in February 1976.

Charts

References

1976 singles
1976 songs
Moe Bandy songs
Songs written by Paul Craft
Songs about Hank Williams